The NCAA Women's Tennis Championship refers to one of three annual collegiate tennis competitions for women organized by the National Collegiate Athletic Association for athletes from institutions that make up its three divisions: Division I, II, and III. At each level, a team championship, a singles championship, and a doubles championship are all awarded.

NCAA Division I Women's Tennis Championship
NCAA Women's Division II Tennis Championship
NCAA Women's Division III Tennis Championship

See also
AIAW Intercollegiate Women's Tennis Champions
NCAA Men's Tennis Championship

Tennis, wome
Tennis tournaments in the United States
College tennis in the United States
Women's tennis in the United States